KIWI (102.9 FM, "Radio Lobo") is a commercial radio station located in McFarland, California, broadcasting to the Bakersfield, California, area. The station is owned by Lotus Communications and licensed to Lotus Bakersfield Corp. KIWI airs a Regional Mexican music format.  Its studios are located in southwest Bakersfield, while its transmitter is located west of McKittrick, California.

Programming
Programming on this station includes Cascabel and Compania on mornings, Isidro Roman on mid-days and Victor Victor on afternoons.

External links
KIWI official website

Regional Mexican radio stations in the United States
Radio stations established in 1989
IWI
1989 establishments in California
IWI
Lotus Communications stations